The 2023 World Women's Snooker Championship was a women's snooker tournament that took place from 28 February to 4 March 2023 at the Hi-End Snooker Club in Bangkok, Thailand, sponsored by the venue and by the Billiard Sports Association of Thailand. The winner received £8,000 from a total prize fund of £25,800 and also earned a two-year tour card on the main professional World Snooker Tour from the start of the 2023–24 snooker season.

Mink Nutcharut was the defending champion, having defeated Wendy Jans 6–5 in the 2022 final, but she lost 2–5 to Siripaporn Nuanthakhamjam in the semi-finals. Nuanthakhamjan defeated Bai Yulu 6–3 in the final to win her first women's world title. The second Thai player to win the title, she entered the top 10 in the women's world rankings for the first time.

Bai's 127 break in her Group L match against Amee Kamani was the highest in the tournament's history, surpassing the 125 break made by Kelly Fisher at the 2003 event. It was the only century break of the tournament.

Background
The Women's Professional Snooker Championship was held ten times between 1934 and 1950, with no tournaments staged between 1941 and 1947. Ruth Harrison won eight of those ten events. The Women's World Open, first held in 1976, is recognised as the beginning of the modern World Women's Snooker Championship. English player Reanne Evans holds the record for the most wins, having won 12 titles, including ten consecutive victories from 2005 to 2014.

Prize fund 
The breakdown of prize money for the event is shown below:

 Winner: £8,000
 Runner-up: £4,000
 Semi-final: £2,000
 Quarter-final: £1,000
 Last 16: £500
 Preliminary Round : £200
 Highest break: £200
 Total: £25,800

Main draw
The draw and results for the knockout stage are shown below.

References

Externl links
Group standings at WPBSA SnookerScores
Knockout results at WPBSA SnookerScores
Breaks of 30 or more at WPBSA SnookerScores

World Women's Snooker Championship
Women's
Snooker
Women's
Women's
World snooker
International sports competitions hosted by Thailand